is a Japanese football manager and coach.

History 
After graduating from Japan Soccer College (Niigata Prefecture), he started a career as a football coach for domestic football clubs.
From 2008 until 2011, he stayed in Shanghai China, where he was the first football coach at a Japanese football team for Japanese nationals and was involved in the creation of the school's club team.

From 2012, he was despatched as a U-14's Laos national team manager to Laos Football Federation by Japan Football Association as a part of football's Asia Development Assistance. At the same time, he worked as an assistant coach for Kokichi Kimura who was despatched to LFF as senior national team manager by JFA.

From 2013, he also worked as both manager of Laos women's national football team and manager of U-14's Laos national team.

Since 2014, he has moved from LFF to Football Federation of Sri Lanka.

References

External links
AFF Women's Championship 2013
AFC U-14's Asia Championship 2014 QF
AFF SUZUKI CUP 2012
ODA White Paper
MYANMAR TIMES
interview
korea republic
cup
 FIFA.com
VFF CUP 2012
bongda+
Laos-Indonesia
FFSL website

1985 births
Living people
People from Kōchi Prefecture
Japanese footballers
Japan Soccer College players
Japanese football managers
Laos national football team managers
Association football defenders